The 2011 German Football League season was the thirty third edition of the top-level American football competition in Germany and twelfth since the renaming to German Football League.

League tables
The league tables of the two GFL divisions:

North

South

Notes

Playoffs

References

External links
 Official GFL website 
 GFL 2011  

Gfl
Gfl
German Football League seasons